Ingeniero Luiggi is a town in La Pampa Province in Argentina.

See also
Delia Parodi (politician born in the town)

References

Populated places in La Pampa Province